GALSI was a planned natural gas pipeline from Algeria to Sardinia and further northern Italy, as an extension to the TransMed Pipeline.

History
The feasibility study was completed in 2005.  The intergovernmental agreement on the GALSI pipeline was signed between Italy and Algeria on 14 November 2007.

Early in 2008 one of the project founders, Wintershall, sold its share to other shareholders and left the project.

In 2007, while surveying the proposed route between Sardinia and Algeria, sonar data from an Autonomous Underwater Vehicle (AUV) revealed a large wreck, later determined to be the French battleship Danton, sunk in 1917.

Route
The pipeline would start from the Hassi R'mel field in Algeria and the  section would run to Koudiet Draouche on the coast of Mediterranean Sea. It would be connected to the existing Italian gas grid in Tuscany.

The exact offshore route should have been selected by Dutch engineering contractor Fugro by July 2008.

As of 2021 project is considered to be shelved.

Technical features
The initial capacity would be 8 billion cubic meters (bcm) of natural gas per annum. Total estimated costs of project are €2 billion. The pipeline was expected to become operational in 2014. The Italian section should have been built by Snam Rete Gas.

Project company
The project company Galsi S.p.A. was incorporated on 29 January 2003 in Milan. The current shareholders of Galsi are:

 Sonatrach (Algeria) - 41.6%
 Edison S.p.A. (Italy) - 20.8%
 Enel (Italy) - 15.6%
 Sfirs (Sardinia Autonomous Region) - 11.6%
 Hera Trading (Italy) - 10.4%

According to the agreement between Sonatrach and Russian Gazprom, it would have been possible for Gazprom to have a stake in the Galsi pipeline.

See also

 Trans-Mediterranean Pipeline
 Greenstream pipeline

References

External links
 Project GALSI (in French)

Natural gas pipelines in Italy
Natural gas pipelines in Algeria
Economy of Sardinia
Proposed pipelines in Africa
Proposed pipelines in Europe
Algeria–Italy relations
Pipelines under the Mediterranean Sea